Tetraphleps is a genus of minute pirate bugs in the family Anthocoridae. There are about 10 described species in Tetraphleps.

Species
These 10 species belong to the genus Tetraphleps:
 Tetraphleps aterrima (J.Sahlberg, 1878) g
 Tetraphleps canadensis Provancher, 1886 i c g
 Tetraphleps edacis Drake & Harris g
 Tetraphleps feratis (Drake and Harris, 1926) i c g
 Tetraphleps latipennis Van Duzee, 1921 i c g b
 Tetraphleps novitus Drake & Harris g
 Tetraphleps osborni Drake g
 Tetraphleps pilosipes Kelton & Anderson, 1962 i c g b
 Tetraphleps profugus Drake & Harris g
 Tetraphleps uniformis Parshley, 1920 i c g b
Data sources: i = ITIS, c = Catalogue of Life, g = GBIF, b = Bugguide.net

References

Further reading

 
 
 
 
 
 
 

Anthocorini
Articles created by Qbugbot